Carlos Reyles is a village in the Durazno Department of central Uruguay.

Geography
It is located on the Route 5 on the spot where Route 4 splits off in a northwestern direction to Río Negro Department.

History
On 16 August 1939 the "nucleus of houses" that were in the area of "Estación Molles" were given the name "Carlos Reyles"  by the Act of Ley Nº 9.860, and on 12 August 1988 its status was elevated to "Pueblo" (village) by the Act of Ley Nº 15.972.

Population
In 2011 Carlos Reyles had a population of 976.
 
Source: Instituto Nacional de Estadística de Uruguay

Places of worship
 Parish Church of the Sacred Heart (Roman Catholic, Franciscan Sisters of the Incarnate Word)

References

External links
INE map of Carlos Reyles

Populated places in the Durazno Department